Lawrence Francis Bretta  (January 12, 1928 – September 2, 2006) was a Massachusetts businessman and politician who served in the Massachusetts House of Representatives and as the Mayor of Somerville, Massachusetts. He was regional director of the General Service Administration until his resignation in February, 1984 while under investigation on corruption charges.  He pleaded guilty to a federal indictment alleging solicitation and acceptance of bribes on connection with the location of a federal Social Security office in the Mystic Mall in Chelsea, Massachusetts and was sentenced to four years in prison. He was released in 1988.

Notes

1928 births
2006 deaths
Mayors of Somerville, Massachusetts
Members of the Massachusetts House of Representatives
20th-century American politicians